The Power of Love or Power of Love may refer to:

Film and television
The Power of Love (film), an early 3D film demonstrated in 1922
"The Power of Love", an episode of The O.C. (2005)
"The Power of Love", an episode of Degrassi: The Next Generation (2004)

Music

Albums
The Power of Love (Fish Leong album), 2003
The Power of Love (Sam Bailey album), 2014
Power of Love (Hour Glass album), 1967
Power of Love (Luther Vandross album), 1991
Harry and the Potters and the Power of Love, 2006
Power of Love, by Arlo Guthrie, 1981
The Power of Love (Captain Sensible album), 1983

Songs
"(You Got) The Power of Love", by The Everly Brothers (1966)
"The Power of Love" (Charley Pride song) (1984)
"The Power of Love" (Jennifer Rush song) (1984), and notably covered by Air Supply (1985), Laura Branigan (1987), and Celine Dion (1993)
"The Power of Love" (Frankie Goes to Hollywood song) (1984)
"The Power of Love" (Huey Lewis and the News song) (1985)
"Power of Love" (Deee-Lite song) (1990)
"Power of Love", by Judy and Mary (1993)
"The Power of Love", a composition by Percy Grainger
"Power of Love/Love Power", by Luther Vandross
"The Power of Love", by 10cc from Ten Out of 10
"The Power of Love", by Corona
"The Power of Love", by Ray Conniff
"Power of Love" (Joe Simon song) (1972)
"Power of Love", by Mahavishnu Orchestra, the opening track from their album Apocalypse
"Power of Love", by Gary Wright, from the album The Dream Weaver
"The Power of Love", from Sailor Moon & The Scouts - Lunarock soundtrack

See also
Love Power (disambiguation)